Howard Friel is an American scholar and author, who writes about foreign policy, public international law, international humanitarian law, human rights, civil liberties, and science-related issues. He wrote The Lomborg Deception: Setting the Record Straight About Global Warming (Yale University Press, 2010), a critique of Bjørn Lomborg's books The Skeptical Environmentalist and Cool It: The Skeptical Environmentalist's Guide to Global Warming.

He also co-authored Israel-Palestine on Record: How the New York Times Misreports Conflict in the Middle East with Richard Falk (Verso, 2007). He co-authored The Record of the Paper: How the New York Times Misreports US Foreign Policy with Richard Falk (Verso, 2004).

In 1995, Friel edited Guns and the Constitution: The Myth of Second Amendment Protection for Firearms in America with Dennis Henigan.

References

External links
"Bjørn Lomborg's missing questions", Howard Friel, The Guardian, August 30, 2010
Friel's blog at Z Net website

Living people
American male journalists
Non-fiction environmental writers
Place of birth missing (living people)
Year of birth missing (living people)
Independent scholars